A Tuckerboot on hydrogen is an 8-person ship, power-assisted by an electric motor that gets its electricity from a fuel cell. Two boats are operating in Hamburg. The design is based on the AMS Tuckerboot 675.

Refueling
The boats are refueled with exchangeable tanks at the hydrogen station at Hamburg Airport

Specifications
Boat 6.76 m long, 2.44 m wide, draft 0.54 m, 15 Nm hydrogen storage tank, with two 1.2 kW/24 V PEM fuel cells, a 24V/180Ah battery, two electric motors (24 V, 28 A each) for 8 passengers.

See also
 Hydrogen ship
 Hydrogen vehicle
 Hydrogen economy

References

External links

Hydrogen ships